Isbister may refer to:

People
 Alexander Kennedy Isbister (1822–1883), Canadian explorer
 Bob Isbister (1885–1963), CFL football player
Bob Isbister Jr., Canadian Football League player in the 1930s and 1940s, son of the above
 Brad Isbister (born 1977), NHL hockey player
Clair Isbister (1915–2008), Australian paediatrician
 James Isbister (1833–1915), Métis founder of Prince Albert, Saskatchewan, Canada
 Katherine Isbister, American game and human computer interaction researcher and designer
 Malcolm Isbister (1850–1920), Scottish-born Canadian politician
 Rod Isbister (born 1963), ice hockey player in the 1980s

Places
Isbister, Shetland, village in Shetland, Scotland
Loch of Isbister, Whalsay, Shetland Islands
Isbister, Orkney, Scotland, site of the Tomb of the Eagles
Isbister Lake, lake in Saskatchewan, Canada